Leland MacPhail may refer to:
 Larry MacPhail (1890–1975), Leland MacPhail, baseball executive
 Lee MacPhail (1917–2012), Leland MacPhail, baseball executive, son of the above